Warren Williams may refer to:

 Warren Williams (American football) (born 1965), American football player
 Butch Williams (born 1952), American ice hockey player
 Warren H Williams (born 1963), Australian country music singer and songwriter
 Warren Heywood Williams (1844–1888), American architect
 Warren Williams (rock musician) (fl. 1958–1964), Australian rock music singer and songwriter

See also
 Warren William (1894–1948), American actor